Catocala ilia, the Ilia underwing, beloved underwing or wife underwing, is a moth of the family Erebidae. The species was first described by Pieter Cramer in 1776. It can be found in the eastern part of the United States as well as southern Canada. Subspecies Catocala ilia zoe can be found in California and Arizona.

The wingspan is 65–82 mm. A spot on its forewing with a distinct white circle which encompasses it distinguishes this moth from others in the same family. Otherwise, the forewing can be extremely variable. The underwing that it is named for can range in color from light orange to a deep red. The moths flies from June to September depending on the location.

The larvae feed on oak, including black, burr, red, and white oaks.

Subspecies
Catocala ilia ilia
Catocala ilia zoe Behr, 1870 (California, Arizona)

References

Further reading

External links
 
 

ilia
Moths of North America
Moths described in 1776
Taxa named by Pieter Cramer